Udesingh Kocharu Padvi is a member of the 13th Maharashtra Legislative Assembly. He represents the Shahada Assembly Constituency. He belongs to the Bharatiya Janata Party In 2004, contesting as a Shiv Sena candidate, he had lost elections to the 84 - Akrani (ST) Assembly Constituency, losing to Kagda Chandya Padvi of the Indian National Congress. In 2009, he contesting as a Shiv Sena candidate, he had lost elections to Shahada Assembly Constituency, losing to Padmakar Valvi of the Indian National Congress. Padvi is one of the two members of these assembly who have assets over one crore but haven't given their Permanent Account Number. He has been described as "Crorepati MLA with no PAN"

References

Maharashtra MLAs 2014–2019
People from Nandurbar district
Marathi politicians
Bharatiya Janata Party politicians from Maharashtra
Shiv Sena politicians
Living people
1970 births